Jake Ryan (born 2 September 1983) is an Australian actor. Ryan was a member of the Australian national Taekwondo team for eight years, before an injury led him to pursue a career in acting. Having begun his acting career in 2003, Ryan has appeared in various feature films and television series. He played the recurring roles of Ray "The Blizzard" Blissett in Underbelly and Harry Smith in Wentworth. Ryan played Robbo in the Seven Network soap opera Home and Away from 2017 to 2020.

Early life
Jake Ryan was born in Melbourne, in 1983. During his childhood, he trained in Taekwondo, earning his black belt at the age of nine, making him the youngest person in Australia to do so at the time. He was a member of the Australian national team for eight years, and a ten-time champion, ranking fourth best in the world on three occasions. He pursued a dream to compete in the 2008 Summer Olympics in Beijing, however, following a knee injury one year prior, he withdrew. Ryan later took an interest in acting, and having trained with such actors as Bill Hunter, he graduated from The Actors' Centre in Sydney following two years of study, followed by extended training at Practical Aesthetics.

Career
Ryan commenced his acting career in 2003, when he first appeared in the short film Trouble in Paradise, before receiving a minor role in his first feature film, in the 2005 Indian romantic comedy, Salaam Namaste. This was followed by appearances in films including, The Sapphires, with Chris O'Dowd and Deborah Mailman, the 2013 adaptation of The Great Gatsby, with Leonardo DiCaprio, and Blue World Order, which stars Billy Zane, while his television credits consist of recurring roles in Underbelly, House Husbands, and a notable appearance in the Foxtel prison drama series, Wentworth (a reimagining of the classic Network Ten prison drama Prisoner), in which he played Harry Smith, the abusive husband of leading character Bea Smith (Danielle Cormack), for which Cormack's character was sentenced for the attempted murder of Harry. His duration in the series lasted from 2013 to 2015 when his character was killed-off. He also appeared in three episodes of the short-lived horror web television series Wolf Creek, which was based on the popular films Wolf Creek and Wolf Creek 2.

In 2016, Ryan was cast in Australian soap opera Home and Away as Robbo, a man who suddenly appears in Summer Bay with amnesia, and having no recollection of prior events. His true identity is revealed as Ryan Shaw, a federal police officer, during the run-up to the 2017 season finale. He made his first appearance on 25 July 2017 during the 30th season. For the role, Ryan lost 13 kg ahead of filming. In addition, Ryan appeared in the 30th anniversary special documentary, Endless Summer: 30 Years of Home and Away, which screened on the Seven Network on 17 July 2018.

In late 2018, Ryan took a brief hiatus from Home and Away, when he was cast in the leading role of New Zealand film Savage, directed by Sam Kelly and was inspired by real-life Kiwi street gangs. He departed Home and Away during the 90-minute opening episode of the 33rd season, which aired on 27 January 2020. His character was killed off following a car accident. Ryan decided to leave, as he did not think there was much more for his character to do. Ryan will next appear in two feature films Streamline and Dishonest Bunch.

Personal life
An avid artist, Ryan plans to open his own exhibition in future.

Ryan has been in a relationship with Alice Quiddington, a DJ, since early 2019, and with whom he has one child, a son, born 6 October 2019. Ryan and Quiddington announced their engagement in April 2021.

Filmography

Taekwondo record

References

External links
 
 
 

1983 births
20th-century Australian male actors
21st-century Australian male actors
Australian male film actors
Australian male soap opera actors
Australian male taekwondo practitioners
Living people
Male actors from Melbourne